Conoblemmus is a genus of crickets in tribe Gryllini; species are recorded from central Asia.

Taxonomy
The genus contains the following species:
Conoblemmus acutifrons Chopard, 1936
Conoblemmus araxianus Gorochov, 1996
Conoblemmus kozlovi Mishchenko & Gorochov, 1981
Conoblemmus privatus (Mishchenko, 1947)
Conoblemmus psammophilus Gorochov, 2001
Conoblemmus riparius (Mishchenko, 1947)
Conoblemmus saussurei Adelung, 1910
Conoblemmus tshirkunae (Mishchenko, 1947)
Conoblemmus vachshianus Gorochov, 1996
Conoblemmus zimini (Tarbinsky, 1932)

References

Gryllinae
Orthoptera genera